Ochotona spanglei is an extinct species of pika (mammal in the family Ochotonidae), known from Late Miocene - Early Pliocene fossil from Oregon (USA). Fossils were also found in Nebraska referred to as Ochotona cf. spanglei.

Ochotona spanglei is the earliest known pika, which inhabited North America. Pika came at the Miocene-Pliocene boundary from Eurasia. Extinction of O. spanglei was followed by an approximately three-million-year-long gap in the known North American pikas record.

Fossil distribution
McKay Reservoir, Oregon, McKay Formation, Hemphillian (10.3 - 4.9 Ma), Ochotona spanglei, the species was discovered here (described from a lower jaw with complete cheek dentition)
Honey Creek, Nebraska, Hemphillian (10.3 - 4.9 Ma), Ochotona cf. spanglei
Mailbox Prospect, Antelope County, Nebraska, Late/Upper Hemphillian (10.3 - 4.9 Ma), Ochotona cf. spanglei

Notes

References

Additional references of the Paleobiology Database

Pikas
Miocene species extinctions
Zanclean extinctions
Prehistoric lagomorphs
Extinct animals of the United States
Prehistoric mammals of North America
Fossil taxa described in 1956